Fourty Niner (1971) is the second album by Clover.

Track listing
All tracks composed by Alex Call; except where noted.
"Harvest" (Ed Bogas, H. McBotti) – 2:19
"Keep On Tryin'" (H. McBotti) – 3:19
"Old Man Blues" – 3:36
"Forty-Niner" (Alex Call, John Ciambotti) – 2:25
"Sound of Thunder" – 2:33
"Chicken Butt" (Alex Call, John McFee, John Ciambotti) – 2:24
"Mr. Moon" – 2:49
"Love Is Gone" – 2:31
"Mitch's Tune" (Alex Call, Mitch Howie) – 3:12
"Sunny Mexico" – 2:06
"If I Had My Way" (Rev. Gary Davis) – 3:07

H. McBotti is a pseudonym for John Ciambotti.

Personnel

Clover
 Alex Call – lead vocals, guitar, piano
 John McFee – lead guitar, pedal steel guitar, piano, organ, vocals
 John Ciambotti – bass, guiro, vocals
 Mitch Howie – drums

Additional personnel
 Ed Bogas – fiddle, piano, guitar, marimbas, organ
 Bruce Campbell – banjo

References

1971 albums
Clover (band) albums
Fantasy Records albums